Annex M is an optional specification in ITU-T recommendations G.992.3 (ADSL2) and G.992.5 (ADSL2+), also referred to as ADSL2 M and ADSL2+ M. This specification extends the capability of commonly deployed Annex A by more than doubling the number of upstream bits. The data rates can be as high as 12 or 24 Mbit/s downstream and 3 Mbit/s upstream depending on the distance from the DSLAM to the customer's premises.

The main difference between this specification and Annex A is that the upstream/downstream frequency split has been shifted from 138 kHz up to 276 kHz (as in Annex B/Annex J), allowing upstream bandwidth to be increased from 1.4 Mbit/s to 3.3 Mbit/s, with a corresponding decrease in download bandwidth.

Deployment
This standard was approved for deployment on Australian networks by the Australian Communications Industry Forum (ACIF).

See also
ADSL2
ADSL2+

External links
ITU-T Recommendation G.992.3 : Asymmetric digital subscriber line transceivers 2 (ADSL2)
ITU-T Recommendation G.992.5: Asymmetric Digital SubscriberLine (ADSL) transceivers - Extended bandwidth ADSL2 (ADSL2+)
ITU-T Recommendations: Series G
ITU-T
Internode ADSL2+ Annex M FAQ
 White Paper on Annex M

References

ITU-T recommendations
ITU-T G Series Recommendations
G.992.5 Annex M